Cyrtandra waianaeensis, the Waianae cyrtandra, is a species of flowering plant in the family Gesneriaceae, native to Oahu, Hawaii. A shrubby tree reaching , it is recommended as an accent or specimen plant due to its textured greenish-yellow to green foliage. Its habitats include disturbed mesic valleys, diverse mesic forests, and wet forests.

References

waianaeensis
Endemic flora of Hawaii
Plants described in 1950
Flora without expected TNC conservation status